Oedipina pacificensis is a species of salamander in the family Plethodontidae. It is found in Costa Rica and Panama. Its natural habitats are subtropical or tropical moist lowland forests, plantations, rural gardens, and heavily degraded former forest. The worm salamander has an average total length of 108 to 175 mm among adults.

References

Oedipina
Taxonomy articles created by Polbot
Amphibians described in 1952